Abock Shoak is a Sudanese boxer. He competed in the men's welterweight event at the 1984 Summer Olympics. He was defeated by South Korean boxer An Young-su in his first round fight.

References

Year of birth missing (living people)
Living people
Welterweight boxers
Sudanese male boxers
Olympic boxers of Sudan
Boxers at the 1984 Summer Olympics
Place of birth missing (living people)